The genus Pezoporus contains three Australian species: the night parrot (Pezoporus occidentalis) and the cryptic ground parrots, the eastern ground parrot (Pezoporus wallicus) and the western ground parrot (Pezoporus flaviventris). The night parrot was previously separated in a distinct genus, Geopsittacus. The genus is part of the tribe  Pezoporini.

Species list
Genus Pezoporus

References

 
Bird genera
Broad-tailed parrots